Ghulam Ahmed Chishti (Punjabi), (often abbreviated to G.A. Chishti) (Punjabi), 
(17 August 1905 – 25 December 1994) was a Pakistani music composer, attributed as being one of the founders of Indian and Pakistani film music. He is also sometimes referred to as Baba Chishti.

Working with filmi music, Chishti excelled at Punjabi compositions and was 'apt at weaving the design of influences around Punjabi music'. With almost 5,000 tunes to his credit, he composed scores for 140 – 150 films and was the first musician to reach the '100 films' threshold in newly independent Pakistan after 1947. Being a poet, he had written lyrics for 12 of the most popular Pakistani film songs besides writing hundreds of other film songs during his career.

Biography

Early life
Ghulam Ahmed Chishti was born in 1905 in a small village Gunnachaur near Jallandhar, now in Nawanshahar district. Early in his childhood, Chishti became fond of music and would sing na`ats at his school. He was later noticed by a stage play director Agha Hashar Kashmiri when Chishti came to Lahore in 1934. Kashmiri was a well-known writer and playwright whose works were praised throughout the Indian subcontinent and would occasionally compose songs for theatres.

Kashmiri hired Chishti to assist him with his work and offered him a salary of 50-rupees-per month. Under Kashmiri's influence, Chishti began learning the intricacies of the music industry and trained with him. Upon Kashmiri's death, Chishti joined a recording company and began composing on his own. Amongst his first records were those for Jaddanbai and Amirbai Karnataki in British India before 1947.

Composing for films in India
Chishti is responsible for bringing Noor Jehan to the Lahore stage, when she was 9-years-old in 1935. Noor Jehan had continued working with Chishti after his later migration to Lahore, Pakistan. He started his career composing music for the films with Deen-o-Dunya in 1936. Once he got some recognition, he was offered to compose music for L. R. Shori's film Sohni Mahival in 1938. There was an earlier movie 'Sohni Mahiwal (1933) also. Later the Censor Board banned his composition for the song Aik Shehr Ki Londiya from the film Shukriya in 1944 bestowing much needed attention upon the composer. He became known for his compositions both in Urdu and Punjabi languages. Baba Chishti also had given some music lessons to the now well-known Indian film musician Khayyam, when Khayyam was still young and briefly had come over to Lahore. Baba Chishti was a contemporary of famous musicians Pandit Amar Nath and Master Ghulam Haider of the 1940s.

Migration to Pakistan
However, for Chishti's career, things were to take a drastic turn for the better, after the independence of Pakistan in 1947. He decided on migrating to Pakistan in 1949, where the film industry was reeling in its infancy. The new industry was at the mercy of learned musicians and filmmakers and lacked funds to compete with the imported Indian films. Chishti offered his services as a musician to the Pakistani film industry.

Due to shortage of talent in the music industry, it is reported that Chishti had to compose music for three films at the same time in 1949. His initial compositions for Sachai, Mundri and Pheray (1949) were simultaneously produced. He was hired by the pioneer Pakistani film producer Nazir Ahmed Khan to compose music for his film Pheray. Upon its initial screening, Pheray (1949) became a blockbuster hit and earned plaudits for the composer. It is reported that the six songs in the film were written, composed and recorded in a single day. Later in 1955, Punjabi film Pattan (1955) came along and became a musical hit film for Baba Chishti. Pattan (1955) really boosted his career and he became a well-sought-after music director by the film producers after the box-office success of this film. Baba Chishti was the music director for Pakistan's many early successful films - for example, Pakistan's first silver jubilee film Pheray (1949), later Chishti composed music for 2 golden jubilee films - Sassi (1954)  and Noukar (1955) and then super-hit films like Dulla Bhatti (1956) and Yakke Wali (1957).

Chishti's discoveries
Ghulam Ahmed Chishti first introduced into the Pakistani film world the following film playback singers...
 Noor Jehan as a singer on Lahore stage when she was just 9 years old, back in 1935.
 Zubaida Khanum in film Billo (1951).
 Saleem Raza in film Noukar (1955).
 Naseem Begum in film Guddi Gudda (1956).
 Nazir Begum in film Miss 56 (1956).
 Mala in film Abroo (1961).
 Masood Rana in a Punjabi film Rishta (1963).
 Parvez Mehdi in film Chann Tara (1973).

Songs
  - Pheray (1949)
  - Munawar Sultana, Film:Pheray (1949)
  - Pheray (1949)
  - Pheray (1949)
  - Laaray (1950)
  - Pattan (1955)
  - Zubaida Khanum, film Pattan (1955)
  - Pattan (1955)
  - Pattan (1955)
  (a lori song) - Naukar (1955)
  (a lori song) - Lakht-e-Jigar (1956)
  - Dulla Bhatti (1956)
  - Guddi Gudda (1956)
  - Guddi Gudda (1956)
  - Peengan (1956)
  - Yakke Wali (1957)
  - Yakke Wali (1957)
  - Yakke Wali (1957)
  - Mitti Diyaan Moortan (1960)
  - Naheed Niazi, lyrics by Sikkedar, film Aabroo (1961)
  - Mera Mahi (1964)
  - Masood Rana, film Daachi (1964)
  - Inayat Hussain Bhatti, film Jigri Yaar (1967)
  - Yaar Des Punjab De (1971)
  - Uchhi Haveli (1971)
  Mian Muhammad Bakhsh, film Ishq Deewana (1971)
  - Runa Laila, film Zaildar (1972)
  - Noor Jehan and Pervez Mehdi, film Chann Tara (1973)

Awards
Ghulam Ahmed Chishti was awarded the Pride of Performance Award for Arts in 1989 by the President of Pakistan.

Death and legacy
Ghulam Ahmed Chishti had a reputation in the Pakistani film industry as a very simple, affable and kind person. Due to his popularity and venerability, he was called Baba Jii (father figure) in the film industry. He died at the age of 89 due to a heart attack on 25 December 1994 in Lahore, Pakistan.

In 2017, a number of TV personalities and film personalities gathered at an event at Alhamra Arts Council in Lahore to pay tribute to Ghulam Ahmed Chishti and his music. This event was organized in collaboration with the Lahore Arts Council.

References

External links
Filmography of Ghulam Ahmed Chishti on IMDb website
Chishti's filmography on Complete Index To World Film (CITWF) website - Archived

1905 births
1994 deaths
People from Jalandhar
Punjabi people
Punjabi-language singers
20th-century Indian male singers
20th-century Indian singers
20th-century Pakistani male singers
Pakistani songwriters
Pakistani musicians
Pakistani film score composers
Recipients of the Pride of Performance
Chishtis